Thomas Walton Haynes (born February 6, 1963) is a former American football safety in the National Football League for the Dallas Cowboys. He also was a member of the Portland Breakers in the United States Football League. He played college football at the University of Southern California.

Early years
Haynes attended Covina High School, where he was two-way player at defensive back and wide receiver. He received All-San Gabriel Valley honors as a senior. He also practiced baseball and basketball.

He enrolled at Mt. San Antonio College for two years. He transferred to the University of Southern California after his sophomore season. As a junior, he was named a starter at cornerback, tallying one interception.

As a senior, he led the team with 5 interceptions. In the 1985 Rose Bowl against Ohio State University, he contributed to the 20-17 win by making 2 interceptions.

Professional career

Portland Breakers (USFL)
Haynes was selected by the Los Angeles Express of the United States Football League in the 1985 USFL Territorial Draft. On February 21, he signed with the Portland Breakers. He started 12 games at safety, making one interception.

Dallas Cowboys (first stint)
In July 1985, he was signed as a free agent by the Dallas Cowboys. He was released after the second preseason game on August 19. In 1986, he was re-signed and placed on the injured reserve list with a thumb injury on August 26. He was cut midway through the season.

Los Angeles Rams
In 1987, he was signed as a free agent by the Los Angeles Rams. He was released on September 1.

Dallas Cowboys (second stint)
After the NFLPA strike was declared on the third week of the 1987 season, those contests were canceled (reducing the 16 game season to 15) and the NFL decided that the games would be played with replacement players. Haynes was signed to be a part of the Dallas replacement team that was given the mock name "Rhinestone Cowboys" by the media. He started all 3 games at strong safety, making 23 tackles, 3 interceptions (led the team), 6 passes defensed (led the team) and 3 sacks (tied for the team lead). Against the New York Jets, he led the team with 8 tackles, 2 sacks and one interception. Against the Washington Redskins, he had 2 interceptions and one sack. He was cut on October 26, at the end of the strike.

In 1988, he was re-signed to participate in training camp. He was released on August 8.

References

1963 births
Living people
Players of American football from Chicago
Players of American football from California
Sportspeople from Los Angeles County, California
American football cornerbacks
Mt. SAC Mounties football players
USC Trojans football players
Boston/New Orleans/Portland Breakers players
Dallas Cowboys players
National Football League replacement players
People from Covina, California